A Christmas Carol, the popular 1843 novella by Charles Dickens (1812–1870), is one of the British author's best-known works. It is the story of Ebenezer Scrooge, a greedy miser who hates Christmas, but is transformed into a caring, kindly person through the visitations of four ghosts (Jacob Marley and the ghosts of Christmas past, present, and future). The classic work has been dramatised and adapted countless times for virtually every medium and performance genre, and new versions appear regularly.

Public readings 
The novel was the subject of Dickens' first public reading, given in Birmingham Town Hall to the Industrial and Literary Institute on 27 December 1853. This was repeated three days later to an audience of 'working people', and was a great success by his own account and that of newspapers of the time. Over the years, Dickens edited and adapted the piece for a listening, rather than reading, audience. Dickens continued to give public readings of A Christmas Carol until his death.

Public readings of the novel continue to be held today, with some readers performing in character as Dickens.

Theatre 
An early theatrical production was A Christmas Carol: Or, the Miser's Warning!, a two-act adaptation of A Christmas Carol by C. Z. Barnett, first produced at the Surrey Theatre on 5 February 1844, just weeks after the publication of the novella. A version by Edward Stirling, A Christmas Carol; or, Past, Present, and Future, sanctioned by Charles Dickens, opened at the Adelphi Theatre in London on 26 February 1844, running for over 40 nights.

1964–1999 
 Throughout the late nineteenth century, and into the early years of the twentieth, British actor Seymour Hicks toured England with his own non-musical adaptation of the story, in which he played Scrooge.
 A Christmas Carol (1964 to present), an original musical stage adaptation written and directed by Tim Dietlein, celebrated its 50th anniversary of consecutive shows in 2015 at the Glendale Centre Theatre. GCT's A Christmas Carol is the longest running adaptation in theatre history. The live performance was filmed and released in 2015 starring Tom Killam as Scrooge and Bradley Bundlie as Tiny Tim.
 A Christmas Carol (1972, 1974 and 1978), an adaptation by Keith Fowler in "Story Theater" style, was presented in Richmond, Virginia. This version premiered in 1972 at the Virginia Museum Theater and was revived in 1974 at the larger Mosque Theater. In 1978, the American Revels Company at the Empire Theater also performed this version.
 A Christmas Carol (1974 to present), original musical-comedy stage adaptation written and directed by, and starring (as Scrooge) Ira David Wood III, which has been performed for the last 39 years on stage at Raleigh's Memorial Auditorium. Wood's A Christmas Carol is the longest running indoor show in North Carolina theatre history.
 A Christmas Carol (1975 to present), a theatrical adaptation that has been performed annually at the Guthrie in Minneapolis, Minnesota, celebrating over 45 years of production. The original adaptation was by Barbara Field; she created a new adaptation for the Guthrie in 1996. The Guthrie Theater changed to a new adaptation by Lavina Jadhwani in 2021.
 A Christmas Carol (1975 to present), a theatrical adaptation that has been performed annually by the Milwaukee Repertory Theater in Milwaukee, WI. The production has taken place annually in the adjacent Pabst Theater, and is now in its fifth adaptation
 A Christmas Carol (1976 to present), a musical adaptation by Charles Jones performed annually at the Omaha Community Playhouse in Omaha, Nebraska, as well as two touring companies with the Nebraska Theatre Caravan.
 A Christmas Carol (1977 to present), a theatrical adaptation performed annually at Theatre Memphis in Memphis, Tennessee.
 A Christmas Carol (1978 to present), a theatrical adaptation performed annually at the Goodman Theatre in Chicago.
 A Christmas Carol (1980 to present), adapted by Jerry Patch, has been presented annually by the Tony-winning South Coast Repertory Company in Costa Mesa, California. John-David Keller is the director, and Hal Landon, Jr. plays Scrooge.
A Christmas Carol (198? to present) has been staged annually in Atlanta, Georgia, since the 1980s, first at the Academy Theatre, and then at the Alliance Theatre.
 A Christmas Carol (1981 to present) has been staged annually in the Matthews Theater at McCarter Theater in Princeton, NJ. 1981-1990 written and adapted by Nagle Jackson. 1991 to present adaptation by David Thompson, directed by Scott Ellis 1991–2000, directed by Michael Unger 2000–2015, directed by Adam Immerwahr 2016–present.
 A Christmas Carol (1981), a musical adaptation which premiered in 1982 at the Hartman Theatre, Stamford, Connecticut. The show was workshopped as a tour in 1981.
Scrooge (1982–Present) is a musical adaptation of the 1970 musical motion picture, performed annually by the Spring Lake Theatre Company in Spring Lake, New Jersey. The show celebrated its 40th anniversary in 2022.
 The Gospel According to Scrooge (1982), a stage musical emphasizing the religious elements of the story began at Jesus People Church in Minneapolis, Minnesota, in 1980; in 1981 it debuted at the Historic State Theater and was later made into a television special featuring actor Dean Jones as the host.
 A Christmas Carol (1982 to present), a theatrical adaptation by Neal Radice performed annually by Alleyway Theatre, Buffalo, NY.
 A Christmas Carol (1983), a theatrical adaptation by Jeffrey Sanzel has been performed annually at Theatre Three in Port Jefferson, New York, for 28 years.
 A Christmas Carol (1985), an adaptation by Bille Brown with music and staged by W. Stuart McDowell, was performed at the Symphony Space in New York City as a fundraiser for the Riverside Shakespeare Company, with narration by Helen Hayes, featuring Len Cariou as Scrooge, and MacIntyre Dixon, Celeste Holm, Raul Julia, Mary Elizabeth Mastrantonio, Harold Scott, Carole Shelley, and Fritz Weaver, and the children's choir of the Anglo-American School. This script was restaged the following year at the Marriott Theatre on Broadway, produced by McDowell and directed by Robert Small, narrated by Ms. Hayes, featuring F. Murray Abraham as Scrooge, and Ossie Davis as Marley's Ghost, June Havoc, and Rex Smith as Bob Cratchit.
 A Christmas Carol (1988), is an original musical adaptation which was written for The Chatham Players in Chatham, New Jersey, by Phillip Wm. McKinley. The ensemble production features Charles Dickens as narrator. In 2008, the production celebrated its 20th anniversary; actor Alan Semok has portrayed Scrooge in the Chatham Production every production year to date since 1994. In 2020, Charles Grayson assumed the role in a filmed version produced by Joe DeVico and directed by Susie Speidel during the COVID-19 pandemic. In 2022, the live version was produced at the theater, with Susie Speidel and Joe DeVico reprising their roles as director and producer. Ed Faver assumed the role of Scrooge, and David Romankow assumed the role of Charles Dickens.
 A Christmas Carol (1988), Patrick Stewart's one-man reading/acting of the story, made its first appearance in London and later on Broadway. On stage he would use a table, chair, stool, lectern and a book with an oversized print cover to enact the entire story. The production has been revived in London and New York several times. It has also been released on compact disc.
 The Scrooge Diary (Canada) (1990 to the present) (In the USA: Scrooge Tells All). Adaptation by Avril Kelly, performed by Welsh actor Phil Arnold, in a solo staged performance. Later performed on license only (two performances) by John Gray, late of RSC.
 A Christmas Carol – A Ghost Story of Christmas (1990), a theatrical adaptation by Michael Wilson (director), with original music by John Gromada, performed at the Alley Theatre for 19 years (1990–1998; 2005–present); Hartford Stage for 17 years (1998–present); and at Washington D.C.'s Ford's Theater for 11 years; published by Dramatists Play Service.
 Scrooge!: A Dickens of a One-Man Show (1991), a theatrical adaptation one person show written by and starring Kevin Norberg portraying all 40-plus characters in a solo performance.
 Scrooge: The Musical (1992), a British stage musical adapted from the 1970 film and starring Anthony Newley.
 A Christmas Carol (1993 to the present), a one-man show of the work performed by Gerald Charles Dickens, great-great-grandson of Charles Dickens, in which he plays 26 characters.
 A Christmas Carol (1993 to the present), a theatrical adaptation at the Public Theatre in Lewiston, Maine adapted by Christopher Schario, Executive and artistic director of the Public Theatre. The adaptation features only 6 actors and a fiddler. Each actor portrays multiple characters except for the actor portraying Scrooge. Michael Bradshaw originated the role of Scrooge in this adaptation.
 A Christmas Carol (1994), a theatrical adaptation by Kevin Von Feldt, produced at the Raymond Theatre in Pasadena, California with recorded narration by John Gielgud. Von Feldt staged the show again in 2008 at the Kodak Theatre with Christopher Lloyd as Scrooge, John Goodman, and Jane Leeves.
 A Christmas Carol: The Musical (1994), a Broadway musical adaptation with music by Alan Menken and lyrics by Lynn Ahrens, ran at The Theatre at Madison Square Garden, New York City yearly until 2003. Starring as "Scrooge" were Walter Charles (1994), Terrence Mann (1995), Tony Randall (1996), Hal Linden and Roddy McDowell (alternating) (1997), Roger Daltrey (1998), Tony Roberts (1999), Frank Langella (2000), Tim Curry (2001), F. Murray Abraham (2002) and Jim Dale (2003). The 2004 television version of the musical starred Kelsey Grammer as "Scrooge".
 A Christmas Carol (1996), an adaptation for a "[cast of] eight actors and a lightbulb" by British director and playwright Neil Bartlett OBE. Currently performing (December/January 2014) at the Old Red Lion Theatre in Islington, London, a well-known fringe theatre.
 A Christmas Carol (1997), a musical adaptation with music by Steve Parsons and book/lyrics by John Popa was performed from 1997 to 2000 at The Players Guild Theatre in Canton, Ohio and was subsequently revived in 2009, continuing to play each holiday season to the present day. This version spawned three cast recordings, one featuring the original cast, a 10th anniversary recording in 2008, and the 2015 cast recording. In 2016 the musical was published for domestic and international licensing by Steel Spring Stage Rights in Los Angeles.

2003–2009 
 A Christmas Carol, written and performed by Greg Oliver Bodine, is a one-man stage adaptation enacted by Charles Dickens himself based on a condensed version of the novel that he used while on the second of his reading tours of the United States. First performed in 2003.
 Steve Nallon's Christmas Carol (2003), theatrical adaptation starring impressionist Nallon as a number of famous people.
 A Christmas Carol (2003), theatrical adaptation by Karen Louise Hebden produced by and performed at Derby Playhouse in 2003 and revived in 2006. On both occasions, Scrooge was played by Ben Roberts.
 A Dickens' Christmas Carol (2003 to present), theatrical adaptation created specifically for Silver Dollar City in Branson, MO. Performed yearly, the 60-minute Broadway-style show is expected to be viewed by more than 1,000,000 people during the 2013 Christmas season.
 A Christmas Carol: the Musical (2005), musical adaptation by Stephen DeCesare. Follows 99% of the original book and has had over 300 performances around the world. It starred Carl DeSimone as Scrooge, Scott Morency as "Marley" and Kim Kalunian as "Belle" from the Academy Players in East Greenwich, Rhode Island.
 A Christmas Carol (2007), theatrical adaptation by Jacqueline Goldfinger produced by and performed at North Coast Repertory Theatre in San Diego. This adaptation has become North Coast Rep's annual Christmas show.
 A Christmas Carol, adapted by Tom Haas, has been performed each year at the Indiana Repertory Theatre for more than 25 years. Set on a minimalist stage covered in snow, this adaptation features the characters narrating their own actions to the audience and intersperses carols and dance along with the visits of the ghosts.
 A Christmas Carol, an adaptation by Adam Graham, first performed on 6 December 2007 by Performing Arts Winchester, part of Winchester Student Union. A one-hour version, it was performed twice a night for the holiday season.
 A Christmas Carol, an adaptation by Ron Severdia, premiered on 6 December 2006 at the Barn Theatre in Ross, CA. In 2007, he toured Europe with a new adaptation of the show.
 A Christmas Carol (2003) a new stage adaptation by Scott Harrison which has been produced in both the UK and the US. Originally performed by The Dreaming Theatre Company in the Kirkgate Victorian street exhibition inside the York Castle Museum, it has also recently been performed across the United States by three separate theatre companies.
 Fellow Passengers (2004), a three-actor narrative theatre adaptation using nearly every word of the novel, first presented at Strawberry Theatre Workshop in Seattle.
 A Christmas Carol: The Traditional Story with Modern Music (2005), a musical adaptation with music and lyrics by Matt Corriel and book by Erica Lipez, premiered at the Foothills Theatre in Worcester, MA in 2005 and is published by Dramatic Publishing Company.
 A Christmas Carol (2006), a stage adaptation by Jeannette Jaquish for the Firehouse Theater in Fort Wayne, Indiana, was performed Decembers of 2006, 2007 & 2009.
 Scrooge! (2006), a musical adaptation by Ken Skrzesz and Doug Yetter performed annually at the Clear Space Theatre Company in Rehoboth Beach, Delaware.
 A Christmas Carol – As told by Jacob Marley (deceased) (2009/10); adapted and performed as a one-man show by James Hyland.
 A Christmas Carol (2008), a stage adaptation by Bryony Lavery with songs by Jason Carr, was written for the Chichester Youth Theatre and performed at Chichester Festival Theatre for Christmas 2008 and 2015. This adaptation was also performed by Birmingham Repertory Theatre for Christmas 2009 (with Peter Polycarpou as Scrooge, Hadley Fraser as Bob Cratchit and Rosalie Craig as Mrs Cratchit) and 2013 and the West Yorkshire Playhouse for Christmas 2010 (with Phillip Whitchurch as Scrooge).
A Christmas Carol (2008), an adaptation written and directed by Kevin Von Feldt, and staged at The Kodak Theater. The cast included Christopher Lloyd as Scrooge, John Goodman as The Ghost of Christmas Present, Jane Leeves as Mrs. Cratchit and pre-recorded narration from John Gielgud.
 A Christmas Carol (2009), a stage adaptation written by Alexandria Haber and produced by Geordie Productions, premiering in December 2009 at the D.B. Clarke Theatre in Montreal, Quebec (Canada).

2010–present 
 A Christmas Carol (2010), a new stage adaptation written by Jim Cook Jr. and produced by the Off Broad Street Players Theater Company in Bridgeton, New Jersey. Follows much of the original text of the novella with some character relationships explored. Premiered in November 2010.
 A Christmas Carol (2010), a stage adaptation by The Pantaloons theatre company, touring England in Winter 2010.
 A Christmas Carol (2010–present), a new stage adaptation by Preston Lane, produced by Triad Stage in Greensboro, North Carolina. Premiered November 2010, starring Gordon Joseph Weiss as Ebenezer Scrooge.
 A Christmas Carol (2010), a musical stage adaptation by Bruce Greer and Keith Ferguson that premiered in Carrollton, Texas, in December 2010.
 A Christmas Carol (2011), a National Theatre of Scotland production adapted, designed and directed by Graham McLaren, premiered at Film City Glasgow. The production was awarded Best Production and Best Ensemble by the Critics' Awards for Theatre in Scotland.
 Ebenezer (2011), a prequel musical by Maurice Walters and Christopher Sparkhall performed at the Canford School.
 3 Ghosts (2011), a steampunk inspired stage adaptation by PiPE DREAM Theatre, written by C.E. Simon and Liz Muller. Premiered in December 2011 at the Beckett Theatre on Theatre Row.
 A Christmas Carol (2012), a musical adaptation with book and lyrics by Ben Horslen and John Risebero and music by Christopher Peake and Nick Barstow, first performed by Antic Disposition in Middle Temple Hall, London, in December 2012 and revived in 2014, 2015, 2017 and 2019. A cast recording featuring Brian Blessed as The Ghost of Christmas Present was released in 2019.
 A Christmas Carol (2014), a musical with book and lyrics by Richard Hough and music by Ben Morales Frost, first performed at The Castle Theatre, Wellingborough in December 2014.
 A Christmas Carol (2014), an adaptation by Anne-Louise Sarks and Benedict Hardie for Belvoir St Theatre, Sydney. The original production featured Robert Menzies as Scrooge, Ivan Donato as The Ghost of Christmas Past, Kate Box as The Ghost of Christmas Present, Steve Rodgers as Bob Cratchit, Ursula Yovich as Mrs. Cratchit, Miranda Tapsell as Tiny Tim, Eden Falk as Fred, and Peter Carroll as Jacob Marley and Grandpa Cratchit (a new character written for the production).
 A Christmas Carol (2015), an adaptation by Patrick Barlow, starring Jim Broadbent as "Scrooge" at Noël Coward Theatre in London.
 A Christmas Carol (2017), a new adaptation by Jack Thorne, directed by Matthew Warchus for The Old Vic. Original cast included Rhys Ifans as Scrooge. The production has played every year since due to popular demand (including via live broadcast for the Christmas 2020 season due to the COVID-19 pandemic) and opened at the Lyceum Theatre on Broadway in 2019, winning 5 Tony Awards.
 A Christmas Carol (2017), a new adaptation by David Edgar, directed by Rachel Kavanaugh for the Royal Shakespeare Company. Cast included Phil Davis as Scrooge. This production was revived for Christmas 2018 with Aden Gillet as Scrooge and will be revived again for the Christmas 2022 season with Adrian Edmondson as Scrooge.
 Humbug (2017), a new adaption by Chuck Puckett, directed by Carol Puckett, performed by The Bank Street Players at the Princess Theater in Decatur, AL.
 An Evening With Charles Dickens Reading A Christmas Carol (2018), a new adaptation by Ronald Rand, directed and performed by Ronald Rand at the Tuscumbia Roundhouse in Tuscumbia, AL.
 Charles Dickens' A Christmas Carol (2018), a one-man show adaptation of the story performed by Jefferson Mays at Geffen Playhouse, Los Angeles. In 2020, the show was filmed live at New York's United Palace and released for a limited time on streaming site On The Stage
 Charles Dickens' A Christmas Carol (2018), an adaptation by Nelle Lee for Shake & Stir Theatre Co, Brisbane. The play first premiered at the Queensland Performing Arts Centre, and included Eugene Gilfedder as Scrooge, Lee as Mrs. Cratchit, and Bryan Probets as all four ghosts. Since then, the play has received seasonal revivals.
 Ebenezer: A Haunted Tale (2020), a virtual play written by Robert Frankenberg and staged/filmed at Open Stage Works in Hauppauge, New York
 A Very Covid Christmas Carol (2020), a virtual play written by Pamela Morgan and streamed at This Moment Productions in Chicago, IL.
 A Christmas Carol (2020), adapted and directed by Nicholas Hytner for the Bridge Theatre, London, features three-actors. Opened in December 2020 during the COVID-19 pandemic before returning in December 2022.
 A Christmas Carol: A Ghost Story (2021), an adaptation by Mark Gatiss (who also played Marley), directed by Adam Penford ran at the Nottingham Playhouse and then Alexandra Palace Theatre for Christmas 2021 season
 A VHS Christmas Carol (2021), a 1980s musical style adaptation by StarKid Productions. With Music by Clark Baxtresser.
 A Christmas Carol (2022), an adaptation by Hilary Bell for Ensemble Theatre, Sydney. The original cast included Bell's father John Bell as Scrooge.

Film

Live action films 
 Scrooge, or, Marley's Ghost (1901), a short British film that is the earliest surviving screen adaptation.
 A Christmas Carol (1908), with Thomas Ricketts as Scrooge. Lost film.
 A Christmas Carol (1910), a 13-minute version of the story starring Marc McDermott as Scrooge and Charles Ogle as Cratchit, with William Bechtel, Viola Dana, Carey Lee, and Shirley Mason.
 Scrooge (1913), starring Sir Seymour Hicks and retitled Old Scrooge for its U.S. release in 1926.
 A Christmas Carol (1914), with Charles Rock as Scrooge.
 The Right to Be Happy (1916), the first feature-length adaptation, directed by and starring Rupert Julian as Scrooge.
 Scrooge (1922), an 18-minute version of the story directed by George Wynn and starring Henry V. Esmond.
 A Christmas Carol (1923), produced in the UK and starring Russell Thorndike, Nina Vanna, Jack Denton, and Forbes Dawson.
 Scrooge (1928) short film made in Lee DeForest Phonofilm sound-on-film process, with Bransby Williams as Scrooge (British Film Institute)
 Scrooge (1935), a British movie, again starring Seymour Hicks as Scrooge.
 A Christmas Carol (1938), starring Reginald Owen as Scrooge, Terry Kilburn as Tiny Tim,  and Gene Lockhart and Kathleen Lockhart as the Cratchits.
 Leyenda de Navidad (1947), Spanish Adaptation
 Scrooge (1951), re-titled A Christmas Carol in the U.S., starring Alastair Sim as Scrooge, Michael Hordern, and Mervyn Johns and Hermione Baddeley as the Cratchits. According to critic A. O. Scott of The New York Times, this film is the best one ever made of the Dickens classic.
 Scrooge (1970), a musical film adaptation starring Albert Finney as Scrooge and Alec Guinness as Marley's Ghost.
 Scrooged (1988) a comedy film starring Bill Murray as a Scroogelike regional boss of a TV station set to direct a Scrooge musical.
 The Muppet Christmas Carol (1992), a musical film featuring The Muppets, with Michael Caine as Scrooge.
 A Christmas Carol (2012) Digital film adaptation released online starring Vincent Fegan as Scrooge. It was released by Guerilla Films worldwide via the Distrify player at 12:01am on 1 January 2012 on the Dickens Fellowship website and a number of other websites and Facebook pages, making it the first new production based upon a new work by Charles Dickens in his bicentennial year.
 A Christmas Carol (2015), an original musical featuring Colin Baker (Doctor Who) and Anthony D.P. Mann as Scrooge.
 A Christmas Carol (2018), a BBC Films stage-to-film adaptation of a one-man performance by Simon Callow, which ran for several seasons on stage in London, based on Charles Dickens's own performance adaptation
 The Passion of Scrooge (2018), a film adaptation by H. Paul Moon of the opera by Jon Deak, featuring the composer with baritone William Sharp and the 21st Century Consort.
 Spirited (2022), a modern musical comedy re-imagining focused on the perspective of the Ghosts, with Will Ferrell as the Ghost of Christmas Present and Ryan Reynolds as the person visited by the ghosts.

Animated films 
 Mister Magoo's Christmas Carol (1962), an American animated Scrooge adaptation from the popular cartoon series Mr. Magoo, where Mr. Magoo is the main character in a stage production of A Christmas Carol. 
 A Christmas Carol (1982) an Australian made-for-television animated Christmas fantasy film from Burbank Films as part of the studio's series of Dickens adaptations from 1982 to 1985. It was originally broadcast in 1982 through the Australian Nine Network.
 Mickey's Christmas Carol (1983), an animated featurette film featuring the various Walt Disney characters with Scrooge McDuck playing the role of Ebenezer Scrooge, Mickey Mouse as Bob Cratchit, Goofy as Jacob Marley, and Donald Duck as Fred.
 A Christmas Carol (1994), an animated version produced by Jetlag Productions, written by Jack Olesker.
 A Christmas Carol (1997), an animated production produced by DIC Productions, L.P. featuring the voice of Tim Curry as Scrooge as well as the voices of Whoopi Goldberg, Michael York and Ed Asner.
 An All Dogs Christmas Carol (1998), an animated direct-to-video film and the de facto finale of the All Dogs Go to Heaven franchise; features the villainous Carface (Ernest Borgnine) as Scrooge, with Itchy (Dom DeLuise) as the Ghost of Christmas Past, Sasha (Sheena Easton) as Present, and Charlie (Steven Weber) as Future.
 Christmas Carol: The Movie (2001), an animated version produced by Illuminated Films (Christmas Carol), Ltd/The Film Consortium/MBP; screenplay by Robert Llewellyn & Piet Kroon; with the voices of Simon Callow, Kate Winslet and Nicolas Cage.
 A Christmas Carol (2006), a computer animated adaptation featuring anthropomorphic animals in the lead roles.
 Bah, Humduck! A Looney Tunes Christmas (2006), a modern retelling featuring Daffy Duck in the Scrooge role, and Bugs Bunny as the host. 
 A Christmas Carol (2009), a performance capture film directed by Robert Zemeckis, and starring Jim Carrey as Scrooge and the three ghosts. From Walt Disney Pictures and ImageMovers, it was released in November 2009 in Disney Digital 3-D. This adaptation, while mostly faithful to the novel, includes such scenes as Scrooge being chased through London and being dropped into his own grave by the Ghost of Christmas Yet To Come.
 Scrooge: A Christmas Carol (2022), an animated musical version and a remake of Scrooge (1970), produced by Timeless Films and written and directed by Stephen Donnelly. It was released on December 2, 2022, on Netflix.

Television 

Between 1944 and 1956, most television versions of the story were staged live.
 An early live television adaptation was broadcast by DuMont's New York station WABD on 20 December 1944.
 Christmas Night, with a ballet and with music by Ralph Vaughan Williams was broadcast on BBC television on 25 December 1946.
 A 25 December 1947 live television version on DuMont starred John Carradine as Scrooge, and featured David Carradine and Eva Marie Saint, the latter in her TV debut.
 A 24 December 1948 live television version on ABC performed by the Rufus Rose Marionettes. 
 A 1948 live television adaptation which aired on The Philco Television Playhouse starred Dennis King as Scrooge.
 The Christmas Carol, broadcast 25 December 1949, is a 30-minute television adaptation that starred Taylor Holmes as Scrooge with Vincent Price as the on-screen narrator.
 A British television version, with Bransby Williams as Scrooge, was televised in 1950.
 An adaptation of A Christmas Carol with Ralph Richardson as Scrooge was shown as a 30-minute filmed episode of NBC's Fireside Theater in 1951.
 The story was dramatized twice, in 1952 and 1953, on Kraft Television Theatre (NBC).
 A Christmas Carol (1954), a filmed musical television adaptation starring Fredric March as Scrooge and Basil Rathbone as Marley, was shown on the TV anthology Shower of Stars. The adaptation and lyrics were by Maxwell Anderson, the music by Bernard Herrmann. The first version in color, only a black-and-white version is currently known to survive. March received an Emmy Award nomination for his performance.
 Eye on New York (1955) A live broadcast on A Christmas Carol with Jonathan Harris as Scrooge 
 The Stingiest Man in Town (1956) was the second musical adaptation. It starred Basil Rathbone and Vic Damone as, respectively, the old and young Scrooge. This was a live episode of the dramatic anthology series The Alcoa Hour.

None of the later versions were done live but were either shot on videotape or filmed. They include:
 Tales from Dickens: A Christmas Carol (1959), was another filmed episode of the half-hour anthology series, again featuring Rathbone as Scrooge, with Fredric March as narrator, produced by Desmond Davis, with the cooperation of The Dickensian Society, London, distributed by Coronet Films "Copyright 1959, Transcription Holdings Ltd.".
 Mr. Scrooge, a 1964 CBC television musical adaptation, starring Cyril Ritchard (Peter Pan Captain Hook) as Scrooge, with Alfie Bass and Tessie O'Shea as Bob Cratchit and his wife.
Carry on Christmas was broadcast in 1969. Scripted by long-term Carry On author Talbot Rothwell, the story was an irreverent take on the tale and featured Sid James as Scrooge. 
 A Christmas Carol (1977), a BBC adaptation with Sir Michael Hordern, who had played Marley's Ghost in two other versions, as Scrooge.
 Rich Little's Christmas Carol (1978), an HBO television special in which impressionist Rich Little plays several celebrities and characters in the main roles.
 A Christmas Carol (1984), starring George C. Scott as Ebenezer Scrooge, David Warner and Susannah York as the Cratchits, with Edward Woodward as the Ghost of Christmas Present. Scott received an Emmy Award nomination for his performance. Clive Donner, who had been the film editor for the 1951 film Scrooge, directed. Novelist and essayist Louis Bayard described this adaptation as "the definitive version of a beloved literary classic", praising its fidelity to Dickens' original story, the strength of the supporting cast, and especially Scott's performance as Scrooge.
 Bah, Humbug!: The Story of Charles Dickens' 'A Christmas Carol (1990), an abridged dramatic reading performed and recorded live at the Pierpont Morgan Library in New York City and broadcast on Public Television. The production was based on Dickens's own adaptation for his dramatic readings. It was hosted by Robert MacNeil and featured James Earl Jones as Scrooge and Martin Sheen as the other characters.
 A Christmas Carol (1999), a television movie directed by David Jones, starring Patrick Stewart as Ebenezer Scrooge. Inspired by Patrick Stewart's one-man stage adaptation of the story but featuring a full supporting cast, this was the first version of the story to make use of digital special effects. Stewart was nominated for a Screen Actors Guild award for his performance.
 A Diva's Christmas Carol (2000) is a VH1-original Christmas television film starring Vanessa L. Williams, Rozonda "Chilli" Thomas, Brian McNamara and Kathy Griffin.
A Christmas Carol: The Musical (2004), starring Kelsey Grammer. This version is unique in that Scrooge meets all three spirits in human form both before and after his night-time encounters, much as Judy Garland encounters Frank Morgan, Ray Bolger, Jack Haley, Bert Lahr and Margaret Hamilton in The Wizard of Oz.
A Christmas Carol (2019), a BBC drama (broadcast in the US on FX) written by Peaky Blinders creator Steven Knight, with Guy Pearce as Scrooge, Andy Serkis as the Ghost of Christmas Past, Charlotte Riley as Lottie/the Ghost of Christmas Present, Stephen Graham as Jacob Marley, Joe Alwyn as Bob Cratchit, Jason Flemyng as the Ghost of Christmas Future, and Vinette Robinson as Mary Cratchit. Thea Achillea, who played Scrooge's daughter in episode 2, went on to star in A Christmas Carol, alongside Serkis. In that version, Serkis voiced Marley's Ghost.

Animated television 
 Mister Magoo's Christmas Carol (1962), an animated musical television special in color featuring the UPA character voiced by Jim Backus, with songs by Jule Styne and Bob Merrill.
 A Christmas Carol (1969), a 45-minute children's afternoon special directed by Zoran Janjic and produced by Australia's Air Programs and aired in the U.S. on CBS on 13 December 1970. Ron Haddrick voiced Scrooge for the Australian production. It was the first in a series titled Famous Classic Tales and sponsored by Kenner when broadcast.
 A Christmas Carol (1971), an Oscar-winning animated short film by Richard Williams, with Alastair Sim and Michael Hordern reprising their roles from the 1951 film. This film was also released theatrically.
 The Stingiest Man in Town (1978), a 51-minute animated made-for-TV musical produced by Rankin-Bass based on the 1956 live-action television musical, starring Walter Matthau as the voice of Scrooge and Tom Bosley as the narrator. Scrooge was drawn to physically resemble Matthau.
 Bugs Bunny's Christmas Carol (1979), an animated television special featuring the various Looney Tunes characters, with the role of Scrooge going to Yosemite Sam.
 A Christmas Carol (1982), an Australian made-for-television animated Christmas fantasy film from Burbank Films as part of the studio's series of Charles Dickens adaptations from 1982 to 1985. It was originally broadcast in 1982 through the Australian Nine Network.
 Brer Rabbit's Christmas Carol (1992), an animated television movie directed by Al Guest and starring the voice of Christopher Corey Smith as Brer Rabbit.
 A Flintstones Christmas Carol (1994), an animated television special based on The Flintstones series produced by Hanna-Barbera Productions, featuring the series' characters putting on a play based on the novel.

Direct to DVD 
 A Christmas Carol (2002), a bonus feature on the DVD release of Peter Ackroyd's docudrama Dickens, portraying a Christmas dinner at Gads Hill Place where Charles Dickens recites the novella to his family and friends. The author is portrayed by Anton Lesser, reprising his role from the docudrama.
 A Sesame Street Christmas Carol (2006), a direct to DVD special featuring Oscar the Grouch in the Scrooge role.
 The Smurfs: A Christmas Carol (2013), a direct to DVD imagining of the story, as told by and featuring the Smurfs.
 2nd Chance for Christmas (2019), a direct to DVD re-imagining, a spoiled pop star (Brittany Underwood) takes the Scrooge role. Featuring Tara Reid, Vivica A. Fox, Jim O'Heir, Mark McGrath and Rob Van Dam (wrestler). Directed by Christopher Ray.

Audio productions

Radio 
 On 19 December 1923 BBC Radio broadcast an adaptation of the story by R. E. Jeffrey.
 Lionel Barrymore starred as Scrooge in a dramatisation on the CBS Radio Network on 25 December 1934, beginning a tradition he would repeat on various network programs every Christmas through 1953. Only twice did he not play the role: in 1936, when his brother John Barrymore filled in because of the death of Lionel's wife, and again in 1938, when Orson Welles took over the role because Barrymore had fallen ill.
A 1940s adaptation starring Basil Rathbone as Scrooge was subsequently issued as a three-record set by Columbia Records.
 On 24 December 1949, Favorite Story broadcast an adaptation with Ronald Colman both hosting and starring as Scrooge. This version used a script nearly identical to the one used in Colman's famous 1941 record album of the story, but a different supporting cast.
 On 24 December 1949, Richard Diamond, Private Detective adapted the story with characters from the series playing the Dickens characters in the style of the radio series and transplanting the story to New York City, with Dick Powell in character as "Richard Diamond" narrating the story.
 On 20 December 1953, The Six Shooter broadcast Britt Ponset's Christmas Carol, in which the title character Britt Ponset tells a young boy who's running away from home a western version of A Christmas Carol, with Howard McNear playing the role of Eben (the Scrooge character).
 Alec Guinness starred as Scrooge in a BBC production from 1951, also broadcast in America, and repeated for several years afterward.
 On 24 December 1953, Theatre Royal, also from the BBC, starred Laurence Olivier in his only recorded performance as Scrooge.
 On 25 December 1965, the BBC aired an hour-long radio version adapted by Charles Lefeaux with music composed and conducted by Christopher Whelen, and starring Ralph Richardson as both The Storyteller and Scrooge.
 On 24 December 1973 and every year until 1987 WNBC-AM in New York City broadcast an adaption featuring prominent on-air staff Don Imus as Ebenezer Scrooge, Big Wilson as the Ghost of Christmas Past, Wolfman Jack as the Ghost of Christmas Present, Pat Whitley as the Ghost of Christmas Future, Murray The K as Bob Cratchit, Gordon Hammet as Jacob Marley and Donna Patrone as Tiny Tim.
 In 1975, CBS Radio Mystery Theatre ran A Christmas Carol starring E. G. Marshall as Scrooge. This is the only episode in which Marshall appeared in a role other than host.
In 1979 KGO News/Talk radio presented a live radio play featuring the station's on-air personalities in the roles of Dickens' characters.
 Beginning in the 1980s, NPR periodically broadcasts a straightforward, faithful version read by comedian Jonathan Winters, in which he plays all the roles.
 Another BBC Radio production, broadcast on BBC Radio 4 on 22 December 1990, starred Michael Gough as Scrooge and Freddie Jones as The Narrator. This production was subsequently re-broadcast on BBC Radio 7 and later on BBC Radio 4 Extra.
 On 21 January 1995, BBC Radio 2 broadcast a complete production of the Leslie Bricusse musical Scrooge live from the Palace Theatre in Manchester, with Anthony Newley as Scrooge.
 In 1995, Quicksilver Radio Theater broadcast a dramatization directed by Jay Stern and starring Craig Wichman as Scrooge, Anthony Cinelli, John Prave, Ghislaine Nichols, Deborah Barta, Joseph Franchini, Jodi Botelho, Elizabeth Stull and Tony Scheinman. The production was originally aired on Max Schmid's The Golden Age of Radio on WBAI, New York, NY on Christmas Eve 1995 and repeated Christmas Day 1995, and is currently syndicated on National Public Radio. The program is currently part of the Theater Collection at the Paley Center for Media in New York.
 Focus on the Family Radio Theatre adapted the story in a 1996 production hosted by David Suchet, narrated by Timothy Bateson and with Tenniel Evans as Scrooge. This production credits Noel Langley's screenplay for the 1951 film as well as Dickens' original book.
 Paul Oakenfold's Urban Soundtracks (1999) included a remixed celebrity reading of the book, including sound effects and dance music in a version for UK dance radio stations.
 WBZ Newsradio 1030 in Boston adapted the play for its radio listeners in 1999. It starred now-retired morning news anchor Gary LaPierre as Ebenezer Scrooge with members of the WBZ Newsradio staff (renamed the WBZ Radio Holiday Players) in various roles, including Carl Stevens as Scrooge's nephew Fred, Deb Lawlor as the Ghost of Christmas Past and New England Patriots play-by-play announcer Gil Santos as Marley's Ghost. WBZ radio producer Michael Coleman gave the prologue and played various characters in the play. It has been broadcast on WBZ every Christmas Eve since.
The Colonial Radio Theatre of Boston produced A Christmas Carol in 2004, and it has been broadcast yearly on Sirius XM Radio. It was released by Blackstone Audio in 2007. Brilliance Audio released the production on CD in 2010.
 A Christmas Carol (2007), a theatrical audio version, written and directed by Arthur Yorinks from Night Kitchen Radio Theater, starring Peter Gerety, noted stage and film actor, as Scrooge. This faithful adaptation features a score by Edward Barnes and carols sung by members of the Frank Sinatra School of the Arts Concert Choir.
 In 2008, David Jason recorded a 10 part abridged reading for BBC Radio 4's Book at Bedtime.
 On 20 December 2014, BBC Radio 4 broadcast a new production adapted by Neil Brand for actors, the BBC Singers and the BBC Symphony Orchestra, recorded before an audience in the BBC Maida Vale Studios and directed by David Hunter. The cast included Robert Powell as Scrooge, Ron Cook as Marley and Tracy-Ann Oberman as Mrs. Fezziwig.
Texas Shakespeare Festival 2014 broadcast of "A Christmas Carol".
 On 18 December 2015, Kathleen Turner starred as Scrooge in a live performance presented as a radio drama at the Greene Space in New York City; a recording of the performance was broadcast on WNYC on 24 December and 25 December 2015. Previous broadcasts at the Greene Space featured F. Murray Abraham (2011), Brian Cox (2012), Tony Roberts (2013) and Mark-Linn Baker (2014) in the role of Scrooge.

Recordings 
 In 1941, Ronald Colman portrayed Scrooge in a famous American Decca four-record 78-RPM album of A Christmas Carol with a full supporting cast of radio actors and a score by Victor Young. This version was eventually transferred to LP and in 2005 appeared on a Deutsche Grammophon compact disc, along with its companion piece on LP, Mr. Pickwick's Christmas, narrated by Charles Laughton. (The Pickwick recording had originally been made in 1944.) The Ronald Colman A Christmas Carol is slightly abbreviated on both the LP and the CD versions; on the LP, this was done to fit the entire production onto one side of a 12-inch 33 RPM record. With the greater time available it was hoped that the CD would have the complete recording, but Deutsche Grammophon used the shorter LP version.
 Also in 1941, Ernest Chappell narrated A Christmas Carol, "dramatized to a musical background," on an album of four 12-inch records for RCA Victor.
 Peter Pan Records released "Charles Dickens: A Christmas Carol" which features a studio recording.
 In 1960, Dan O'Herlihy recorded the complete Dickens novel on a set of 4 16-RPM LP's, one of the few instances that this speed was used for a professional recording. This version was one of the first audiobooks ever made, and is now available on CD. It was originally released on LP by a company called Audio Book Records, perhaps the first use of that term ever coined.
 Ralph Richardson and Paul Scofield were featured on a 1960 Caedmon Records (TC-1145) adaptation of the story.
 An Adaptation of Dickens' Christmas Carol (1974) is an audio musical recording with six original musical numbers, featuring various Disney characters playing the Dickens roles. It was adapted (without the songs) into the animated short Mickey's Christmas Carol in 1983.
 In 1977, Roy Dotrice recorded a slightly abridged reading for Argo Records (ZSW 584/5) with music as linking for the "staves".
 Patrick Stewart has recorded his one-man dramatic reading of the story.
 The actor Gerald Charles Dickens, the great-great-grandson of Charles Dickens, has recorded a CD of A Christmas Carol which is unabridged and in which he plays twenty-six characters. His performance is based on Charles Dickens' original reading tour script.
 In 2003, actor Jim Dale released an unabridged reading with full characterizations of all the roles as part of the Random House Listening Library series.
 Former Doctor Who Tom Baker recorded an unabridged reading released in 2012 for the BBC's AudioGo Ltd.
 Nottingham broadcaster Steve Oliver recorded an audio book in four 'staves' based on the original public reading script.
 Tim Curry narrated an unabridged "Signature Performance" recording for Audible.
 Audible released an original audio dramatization of the novel in 2016, adapted by R.D. Carstairs, featuring Sir Derek Jacobi as Charles Dickens, Kenneth Cranham as Scrooge, Roger Allam as Marley, Brendan Coyle as The Ghost of Christmas Past, Miriam Margolyes as The Ghost of Christmas Present, Tim McInnerny as The Ghost of Christmas Yet To Come, Jamie Glover as Bob Cratchit, Emily Bruni as Mrs. Cratchit, Jenna Coleman as Belle, Joshua James as Young Scrooge, and Hugh Skinner as Fred. (NOTE: This is one of the only two currently-known audio productions in which the Ghost of Christmas Yet to Come actually speaks, the other being a rare 1947 ABC radio version starring Lionel Barrymore.)

Opera 
 Mister Scrooge (1958–1959); alternative name: Shadows (Tiene), an opera by Slovak composer Ján Cikker.
 A Christmas Carol (1978–1979), an opera by Thea Musgrave.
 The Passion of Scrooge (or A Christmas Carol) (1998), a chamber opera by Jon Deak for one baritone and chamber orchestra.
 A Christmas Carol (2014), by Iain Bell, libretto by Simon Callow, which premiered at Houston Grand Opera on 5 December 2014, with Heldentenor Jay Hunter Morris and former Houston Grand Opera Studio member Kevin Ray alternating in the single role of the Narrator.
 A Christmas Carol (2022), an opera composed by Graeme Koehne and set to a libretto by Anna Goldsworthy. In this adaptation, the story is relocated to present day Melbourne, and features a number of references to Australian culture (such as The Ghost of Christmas Present being portrayed as a surf lifesaver). The opera was produced by Victorian Opera, and ran for four performances at the Palais Theatre in mid-December.

Ballet 
 A Christmas Carol (1992), a live production performed by Northern Ballet. This adaptation was recorded in 1992 and released on DVD in 2005
 A Christmas Carol (1994–present), a production performed annually by The Ulster Ballet Company of Saugerties, New York
 John Clifford premiered his new production A CHRISTMAS CAROL:The Ballet, for The Portland Ballet on 27 November 2021

Graphic novels 
 A Christmas Carol (1948) Classics Illustrated #53 US release (Gilberton); #15 UK release, adaptation, script by George Lipscomb and drawn by Henry C. Kiefer
 A Christmas Carol (1951) Dell Giant — A Christmas Treasury #1 (Dell Comics), drawn by Mike Sekowsky
 A Christmas Carol (1978) Marvel Classics Comics #36 adaptation, drawn by Diverse Hands, script by Doug Moench
A Christmas Carol (1990) Classics Illustrated #16 (First Comics) adapted by Joe Staton
Sonic's Christmas Carol (1993) A backup story featured in Archie Comics' Sonic the Hedgehog #6. It casts Dr. Robotnik as Scrooge, Rotor Walrus as Bob Cratchit, Snively as Jacob Marley and Sonic as all three ghosts.
Batman: Legends of the Dark Knight, Halloween Special #3: Ghosts (1995), written by Jeph Loeb and drawn by Tim Sale. The setting was changed to Halloween.
 Christmas Carol (2004), drawn by Dick Matena
A Christmas Carol (2007) Saddleback Educational Publishing 
 A Christmas Carol: The Graphic Novel (2008), by Sean Michael Wilson and Mike Collins. The graphic novel was chosen as one of the Top Ten Graphic Novels of the year by The Sunday Times.
A Christmas Carol (2010) Campfire Classics graphic novel adaptation 
 Adaptation by Alex Burrows included in Christmas Classics: Graphic Classics Volume Nineteen (2010)
Batman: Noël (2011), a graphic novel written and illustrated by Lee Bermejo, featuring a tale with the Caped Crusader inspired by A Christmas Carol.
Zombies Christmas Carol (2011), an adaptation of the original story by Marvel Comics with zombies as a metaphor for the hungry and needy, the source of the plague being Scrooge's own hatred and bitterness towards man.
A Christmas Carol (2012) Stephen L. Stern and artist Douglas A. Siroisin a full-color adaptation of the story.
A Christmas Carol Starring Scrooge McDuck (2019) based on the Disney version, adapted by Guido Martina with art by Jose Colomer Fonts. Cover drawn by Giovan Carpi.

Comic strips 
 A story arc in the comic strip FoxTrot has Jason dreaming that he is Ebenezer Scrooge, with his friends and family members playing the other roles.
Of Christmas Past is a short comic strip by Johnny Lowe and Seaward Tuthill in the literary trade paperback Iconic released in 2009 by members of the Comicbook Artists Guild. It deals with Scrooge's nephew Fred facing the decision of what to do about a criminal who murdered his wife, with the ghost of Scrooge playing the role of the three spirits to try to save him from a path of darkness.

Parody 
 Kenny Everett's Christmas Carol (1985), a Christmas special episode of his BBC series with many famous cameos.
 Blackadder's Christmas Carol (1988), in which the central character, Ebenezer Blackadder (Rowan Atkinson), is initially kind and generous, but after being visited by the Spirit of Christmas (Robbie Coltrane), becomes greedy, insulting and mean.
Beavis and Butt-head, (1995) "Huh-Huh-Humbug", an episode with Beavis as Scrooge.
The Haunted Tea-Cosy: A Dispirited and Distasteful Diversion for Christmas (1998) by Edward Gorey (1998), in his typical surreal style.
 I'm Sorry I Haven't a Christmas Carol (2003), a Christmas special for the BBC Radio 4 panel game I'm Sorry I Haven't a Clue, with central character Ebenezer Scrumph (Humphrey Lyttelton) and assistant Colin Crotchet (Colin Sell).
 Karroll's Christmas (2004), The Scrooge character, Zebidiah Rosecog (Wallace Shawn) is the neighbor of Allen Karroll (Tom Everett Scott), who is visited by the three ghosts instead due to a mistake in address.
 An American Carol (2008), Presented from a conservative-leaning perspective, the film is a parody of liberal filmmaker Michael Moore as well as his editorial documentaries that satirize Hollywood and American culture. It uses the framework of Charles Dickens' 1843 novella A Christmas Carol, but moves the setting of the story from Christmas to Independence Day.
 In the Bleak Expectations series 3 episode "A Now Grim Life Yet More Grimified" (2009), Pip Bin is visited during Harvest Festival by the Ghost of Harvest Festival after torture by his nemesis Mr Gently Benevolent resulted in him becoming a reclusive miser. However, it is revealed that this was a theatrics-based con by Benevolent, himself playing the Ghost, to trick Pip into giving him his fortune.
 A Christmas Chuckle (2009), a family comedy show written by and starring The Chuckle Brothers which toured Britain in November and December 2009.
 All American Christmas Carol (2013), A white-trash mom is visited by three ghosts intent on showing her a path to a brighter future. Starring Taryn Manning, Beverly D'Angelo, Wendi McLendon-Covey, Meat Loaf, Eric Roberts, and Lin Shaye. 
A Christmas Boner in 2013 by Conor Lastowka, a rewrite of A Christmas Carol in which Scrooge has priapism throughout. This was in the vein of other parody mashups like Pride and Prejudice and Zombies.
Epic Rap Battles of History (2013) episode "Donald Trump vs. Ebenezer Scrooge" features Ebenezer Scrooge rap battling Donald Trump (representing Jacob Marley), J.P. Morgan (representing the Ghost of Christmas Past), Kanye West (representing the Ghost of Christmas Present), and the Ghost of Christmas Yet to Come (represented in traditional form).
Soylent Scrooge, (2017) a radio parody inspired by A Modest Proposal and the film Soylent Green in which Scrooge and Marley own a factory that converts the poor into foodstuffs. Other Dickens characters also appear in the story and fake commercials.
 Q Brothers Christmas Carol (2018), a hip-hop parody of Christmas Carol, produced by the Q Brothers (JQ and GQ), performed at the Chicago Shakespeare Theater.
 Canadian comedy actor Don Harron recorded a version as "Charlie Farquharson" using malaprops.
Turn of the Scrooge, a parody sequel wherein Marley faked his death and conspired with Bob Cratchit and Tim, himself a child-faced gangster, to steal Scrooge's fortune on Christmas Eve, and attempt to successfully repeat their performance the following year.
A VHS Christmas Carol: Live! (2021), A 1980s inspired Christmas Carol musical parody, performed by Starkid Productions. The musical was written by Clark Baxtresser and directed by Corey Lubowich. It ran successfully for three nights (9–11 December) at the Bourbon Room Theater in Hollywood, California.

Derivative works 
The basic plot of A Christmas Carol has been put to a variety of different literary and dramatic uses since Dickens' death, alongside sequels, prequels, and stories focusing on minor characters.

Film 
 It's Never Too Late (1953), Italian adaptation of Dickens's novel, featuring Paolo Stoppa and Marcello Mastroianni.
  Scrooged (1988), a modern retelling that follows Bill Murray as Frank Cross, a cynical and selfish television executive who produces a live Christmas Eve show. The film also stars Karen Allen, John Forsythe, Bobcat Goldthwait, Carol Kane, Robert Mitchum, Michael J. Pollard and Alfre Woodard.
 Surviving Christmas (2004), a romantic comedy about a wealthy advertising executive who hires a suburban family to be his pretend family. The film ends with the main characters seeing a community theatre production of A Christmas Carol. Earlier in the film, the executive also hires the actor who plays Scrooge in the production to be his pretend grandfather.
 Scrooge & Marley (2012), a gay film adaptation featuring David Pevsner as Ebenezer "Ben" Scrooge
 Mister Scrooge to See You (2013) One year after the classic Dickens' A Christmas Carol Ebenezer Scrooge finds himself on a new journey. Once again he is visited by Jacob Marley. This time Scrooge is sent on an adventure which takes him into the life of Timothy Cratchit the VI, the great-great-great-grandson of Bob Cratchit.
 My Dad Is Scrooge (2014), a fantasy film about talking animals using the novella to help a Scrooge-like father (played by Brian Cook) see the error of his ways.
 A Christmas Carol (2018), a contemporary retelling of the story set in Scotland, featuring Stuart Brennan as distillery-owner Scrooge, Bonnie Wright as Nell and Sarina Taylor as a female Bob Cratchit. Digital online release.
 The Man Who Invented Christmas (2017), a film about Charles Dickens' struggle to write the book while dealing with his personal life with his characters, especially Ebenezer Scrooge (played by Christopher Plummer), seeming to haunt him with their opinions.
 A Christmas Carol (2020), a British Christmas drama dance film directed by Jacqui Morris and David Morris.
 Marley (TBA), an upcoming musical film by Walt Disney Pictures, which will adapt A Christmas Carol through Jacob Marley's perspective. Bill Condon will write and direct the film.

Television movies 
 Rod Serling's A Carol for Another Christmas (1964) was a United Nations special sponsored by Xerox, with Sterling Hayden as Scrooge character Daniel Grudge.
 An American Christmas Carol (1979), an adaptation starring Henry Winkler. Set in Depression era New England, the Scrooge character is named Benedict Slade.
 Skinflint: A Country Christmas Carol (1979), an American country music-inspired TV film starring Hoyt Axton as Cyrus Flint.
 John Grin's Christmas (1986) African-American adaptation produced, directed and starring Robert Guillaume.
 Ebbie (1995), a TV movie with the first female portrayal of Scrooge, starring Susan Lucci as Elizabeth "Ebbie" Scrooge, owner of a huge department store, and some of her own employees doubling as the three Christmas Spirits.
 Ms. Scrooge (1997), a TV movie starring Cicely Tyson as "Ebenita Scrooge", the managing director of a loan company, and Katherine Helmond as her deceased business partner Maude Marley.
 Ebenezer (1997), a Western version produced for Canadian TV, starring Jack Palance as land baron Ebenezer Scrooge.
 The Ghosts of Dickens' Past (1998), a mysterious girl (Jennifer Bertram) inspires Charles Dickens (Christopher Heyerdahl) to encourage charity and discourage child labor by writing A Christmas Carol.
 A Christmas Carol (2000), A TV-movie that takes place in the present where Ross Kemp plays Eddie Scrooge, a London loan shark. Jacob Marley (Ray Fearon) not only warns Scrooge of the three impending spirits, but doubles as the Ghost of Christmas Present.
 A Diva's Christmas Carol (2000), TV movie that premiered on VH1, now on Lifetime, portraying Vanessa Williams in the Scrooge role as "Ebony" Scrooge, one third of a late-'80's pop trio called "Desire" and now an egotistical, arrogant, grouchy solo diva.
 Scrooge & Marley (2001), a Christian-themed television film adaptation set in a fictional New England town called Winterset, Connecticut. It was directed by Fred Holmes and produced by the Coral Ridge Ministries, starring Dean Jones as Ebenezer Scrooge, who in this adaptation starts out as an atheist and a personal injury lawyer. Also adapted from the book What If Jesus Had Never Been Born? In the United States, the film aired on Trinity Broadcasting Network on 21 December 2001 and then 25 December; it also aired on syndicated stations on 24–25 December and then as part of The Coral Ridge Hour on 29–30 December and has since aired on TBN and other syndicated stations in subsequent years.
A Carol Christmas (2003), another TV movie portraying Scrooge as an arrogant female celebrity, this time a TV talk show host named "Carol Cartman", played by Tori Spelling. Also featured were Dinah Manoff as Marla, Carol's stage mother-type aunt, Gary Coleman as the Ghost of Christmas Past, William Shatner as the Ghost of Christmas Present and an uncredited James Cromwell as the Ghost of Christmas Future.
 Chasing Christmas (2005), TV film with the Ghost of Christmas Past (Leslie Jordan) going AWOL, leaving the 'Scrooge' of this story (Tom Arnold) stuck in 1965.
 Ghosts of Girlfriends Past (2009), a romantic comedy film starring Matthew McConaughey as the Scrooge-like character "Connor Mead".
 Christmas Cupid (2010), made-for-TV movie starring Christina Milian as the Scrooge-inspired character "Sloane Spencer".
 It's Christmas, Carol! (2012), a made-for-TV movie starring Emmanuelle Vaugier as an arrogant Chicago-based book publisher; her former boss, Eve (Carrie Fisher) approaches her on Christmas Eve and functions as all three spirits, Past, Present and Yet To Come.
 A Nashville Christmas Carol (2020), a made-for-TV movie starring Jessy Schram as the producer of a Christmas TV special who has become so devoted to her work that she has shut out emotional contact with people; her late former boss and mentor (Wynonna Judd) appears to her and with the help of Christmas Past and Present shows her parts of her past she never knew and how they affected her present. The story is very loosely based on Dickens' work and The Ghost of Christmas Yet-To-Come is not part of this story.
 Christmas Carole (2022), a made-for-television comedy written by Anil Gupta and Richard Pinto, and starring Suranne Jones as a Scrooge-like entrepreneur named Carole Mackay, with the three ghosts represented by Morecambe and Wise (played by actors Jonty Stephens and Ian Ashpitel), Jo Brand and Nish Kumar.

TV series episodes 
 Topper (1953); Henrietta reads "A Christmas Carol" to Topper and their guests. Topper falls asleep during the reading and dreams he is Scrooge.
 Bewitched (1967); in the episode "Humbug not be Spoken Here". Samantha takes a miserly client of Darrin's to the North Pole on Christmas Eve to meet Santa Claus.
 The Smothers Brothers Comedy Hour (1967); the episode aired on 24 December 1967 included an 18-minute parody sketch in which Tommy Smothers plays Ebenezer Scrooge III and Jack Benny plays Bob Cratchit.
 The Odd Couple (1970); in the episode "Scrooge Gets an Oscar", Felix and the other poker players become Dickens characters in a dream after Oscar refuses to be Scrooge in a children's play.
 Omnibus (1973), UK; "A Christmas Carol", a Dickens favourite as interpreted by mime artist Marcel Marceau.
 Sanford and Son (1975); in the episode "Ebenezer Sanford", tightfisted Fred gets a ghostly wake-up call in this spoof of "A Christmas Carol."
 Little House on the Prairie (1975); in an episode that serves as a twist on the Dickens story, actor Ted Gehring plays "Ebenezer Sprague", a Scrooge-type self-centered and miserly banker who refuses to give and receive until a near-falling out with the Ingalls family over a loan (an analogue for the three Christmas ghosts) changes his ways.
 The Six Million Dollar Man (1976); in "A Bionic Christmas Carol", Steve Austin uses his bionic abilities to make an old miser change his ways. 
 WKRP in Cincinnati (1980); in the episode "Bah Humbug", Mr. Carlson plans to give the staffers no Christmas bonuses. But after eating one of Johnny Fever's "special" brownies, the ghosts of Christmas Past (Jennifer), Present (Venus) and Future (Johnny) visit him to show him the error of his ways.
 Alice (1981); in the episode "Mel's Christmas Carol", Mel Sharples is haunted by a former business partner Jake, after he fires the waitresses from his diner on Christmas Eve. 
 Family Ties (1983); in the episode "A Keaton Christmas Carol", Alex finds the spirit of Christmas in a dream when he is shown visions of the past and future by ghosts of Mallory and Jennifer.
 Highway To Heaven (1984); in the episode "Another Song For Christmas", Jonathan and Mark become involved in their own version of Dickens' classic "Christmas Carol", involving a heartless used car salesman. Directed by Michael Landon. 
 Fame: (1985); in the episode "Ebenezer Morloch", Mr. Morloch falls asleep and is visited by three ghosts.
 George Burns Comedy Week: "A Christmas Carol II" (1985), an episode in which Scrooge is good-natured to a fault and all of Camden Town takes advantage of his generosity to the point of taking all his money. This prompts t he spirits to return and make sure Scrooge achieves a balance between his past and current behavior.
 Beverly Hills Teens: (1987); In "Miracle at the Teen Club - Part 1" and "Miracle at the Teen Club - Part 2" The teens envision themselves as the players in a Christmas Carol allegory while snowbound during Buck Huckster's Christmas Eve Party.
 A Different World (1989); in the episode "For Whom the Jingle Bell Tolls", Whitley plays the Scrooge role over her mother's plans to visit the French Riviera for Christmas. She receives visits from the ghosts of Christmas Past (Mr. Gaines), Present (Walter) and Future (Jaleesa).
 Mr. Belvedere (1989) in the episode "A Happy Guys Christmas" The Happy Guys of Pittsburgh are putting on their annual Christmas play and have decided on "A Christmas Carol". The entire Owens family is cast, but when Mr. Belvdere gets frustrated with the poor directing, he takes over the job, only to quit in a huff. This leads to Mr. Belvedere being visited by the Ghost of Christmas Past, Present and Future.
 Star Trek: The Next Generation (1991): "Devil's Due": Data plays Ebenezer Scrooge in a theatre performance.
 Northern Exposure (1994); in the episode "Shofar, So Good", Joel Fleischman learns the meaning of Yom Kippur from the ghosts of Yom Kippur Past, Present and Future.
 Martin (1996); in the episode "Scrooge", Martin is visited by three Christmas spirits to encourage Martin's Christmas spirit and the joy of giving.
 Xena: Warrior Princess (1996); in the episode "A Solstice Carol", Xena and Gabrielle help save an orphanage from being shut down by a tyrant king on Solstice Eve, by impersonating the three Fates.
 I Was a Sixth Grade Alien (2000); in "A Very Buttsman Christmas", Ms. Buttsman is in charge at the embassy and planning on cancelling Christmas. This upsets Pleskit and Tim very much, especially because it would be Pleskit's first. As Ms. Buttsman drifts off into a deep sleep, she is visited by the ghost of Christmas Present, Past and Future.
 Nan's Christmas Carol (2009) is a spin-off of The Catherine Tate Show. The one-off special, based on Dickens' novella, is about Nan visited by three ghosts on Christmas night in her council flat.
 Doctor Who: A Christmas Carol (2010) – the 2010 Christmas special episode of Doctor Who borrowing elements from Dickens' novel, as the Eleventh Doctor attempts to make a miserly man who controls equipment that could save his companions from a crashing ship change his ways by influencing the man's past, culminating in him bringing the man's child-self into the future. Dialogue acknowledges the source, and Dickens himself has appeared as a character in two unrelated episodes.
 It's Always Sunny in Philadelphia (2010); in the episode "A Very Sunny Christmas," Dee and Dennis blame Frank for ruining their childhood Christmases, and try to teach him a lesson by staging a haunting by Frank's former business partner, whom Frank believes is dead.
 Suite Life on Deck (2010) A London Carol: London is too selfish to give anything for homeless and sick children during Christmas when Cody and Bailey asked for donations for needy children. On Christmas Eve night, London's mirror takes her back to the past, the present and future to learn her lesson.
 Kelly Clarkson's Cautionary Christmas Music Tale (2013), an NBC television special loosely based on A Christmas Carol featuring Kelly Clarkson playing a Scrooge-like role.
 Classic Alice, a 2014–2015 web-series re-imagining with Alice playing Scrooge as she leads herself through the ghosts of past, present, and future to discover what she really wants.
 General Hospital 2019 "General Hospital's Christmas Carol" Actors from the long running soap portray the characters from Dickens novella. Actor Michael Easton portrays Scrooge.
 A Christmas Carol Goes Wrong (2017), a BBC One television special written by and starring Henry Lewis, Jonathan Sayer, Henry Shields and Mischief Theatre Company in which the fictional Cornley Polytechnic Drama Society disastrously attempts to perform a TV adaptation of the story. Guest starring Derek Jacobi and Diana Rigg.
 In the Upstart Crow 2018 Christmas special, A Crow Christmas Carol, William Shakespeare (played by David Mitchell) is told the story of A Christmas Carol by a mysterious stranger (played by Kenneth Branagh). Will then uses the premise to try and make the miserly Sir Robert Greene (played by Mark Heap) to become a better person, after which he allows 'some future author' to write the story instead as a gift.
Staged (2022); in the episode "Knock, Knock", David and Michael perform an improvised adaptation of A Christmas Carol during a livestream.

Animated 
 Gumby 1957 "Scrooge Loose" A Gumby Christmas Carol in which Gumby plays Sherlock Holmes to find and capture Ebenezer Scrooge, who has escaped out of the book by Charles Dickens and who is bent on ruining Christmas! Scrooge has walked into a book on Santa Claus stories, and he is replacing the presents with rocks on Christmas Eve. It's up to Gumby and Pokey (whom Gumby calls "Dr. Watson") to capture the humbuggish Scrooge and put a stop to his antics.
 Bugs Bunny's Christmas Carol (1979) The cartoon is an adaptation of the Dickens novella, featuring Yosemite Sam as Ebenezer Scrooge, Porky Pig as Bob Cratchit and Bugs Bunny as Jacob Marley and Fred. Scrooge's dream-journey into his past, present, and future is omitted; instead, Bugs dresses up as a white-robed emissary of Hades to scare Scrooge straight.
 The Dukes (1983) "A Dickens of a Christmas" in this episode of the animated version of The Dukes of Hazzard, Boss Hogg has a Scrooge like experience. 
 The Jetsons "A Jetson Christmas Carol" (1985) Spacely orders George to work overtime on Christmas Eve while Astro causes himself to be sick. Three spirits visit Spacely to convince him that Christmas is a time of giving.
 The Real Ghostbusters (1986) In the episode "X-Mas Marks the Spot", on Christmas Eve Peter Venkman, Ray Stanz, Egon Spangler, and Winston Zeddmore end up traveling back in time to 1837 England, where they unknowingly meet Scrooge and end up "busting" the Three Christmas Ghosts by accident. It is revealed that Peter's childhood was very similar to Scrooge's.
 Beverly Hills Teens (1987) "Miracle at The Teenclub parts I & II", The teens envision themselves as the players in a Christmas Carol allegory while snowbound during Buck Huckster's Christmas Eve Party
 Bravestarr "Tex's Terrible Night," (1987) The series' villain, Tex Hex, fills the Scrooge role while the Shaman helps him to see the error of his ways, temporarily.
 Camp Candy (1989) In the episode "Christmas in July" During a summer heat wave, the Camp Candy gang cools things off by staging a make-believe "Christmas in July." But when crabby Vanessa says "Bah humbug!" to their plan, the campers teach her about true holiday spirit with a goofy Camp Candy version of Charles Dickens' classic "A Christmas Carol."
 The Chipmunks (1989) "Merry Christmas, Mr. Carroll" an episode of "The Chipmunks" in which Alvin is scrooge like and experiences the three spirits.
 Animaniacs (1993) "A Christmas Plotz", a Warner version of A Christmas Carol, with the Warners as the three spirits, Slappy Squirrel as Jacob Marley and Thaddeus Plotz as Ebenezer Scrooge.
 Avenger Penguins, UK (1994) "A Christmas Carol" Charles Dickens' novella is parodied in this episode. Doom realises he must restore power to the city after he blacks it out.
 101 Dalmatians: The Series (1997) "A Christmas Cruella" An adaption of Dickens' novella with Cruella in the role of Scrooge, Jasper and Horace as Marley, Cadpig as the ghost of Christmas Past, Rolly as the ghost of Christmas Present, and Spot as the ghost of Christmas Yet To Come.
 An All Dogs Christmas Carol (1998), animated TV movie based on All Dogs Go to Heaven and featuring the villainous Carface as this version's Scrooge.
 Arthur (1999) "Prunella Gets It Twice" Prunella gets two dolls for her birthday and dismisses the second one, which is from Francine. Later, Prunella thinks that Francine spoiled the party by not joining in on the festivities. That night, Prunella has a dream where the Ghost of Presents Past takes her through time to clear things up and shows how far Francine went to get the doll for Prunella and makes her realize that Francine's attitude was because of how Prunella didn’t appreciate the present.
 Adventures from the Book of Virtues (2000) An adaptation of A Christmas Carol with Annie in the role of Scrooge, Zack in the role of Bob Cratchit, Plato in the role of Jacob Marley, Aristotle in the role of the Ghost of Christmas Past, Socrates in the role of the Ghost of Christmas Present, Aurora in the role of the Ghost of Christmas Yet to Come, and an unnamed blond orphan boy in the role of Tiny Tim.
 Maxine's Christmas Carol (2000) In this modernized (Y2K), animated adaptation of Charles Dickens' novel, A Christmas Carol, Hallmark Card comic character Maxine is the Scrooge.
 Pepper Ann (2000) "A Valentine's Day Tune" In this Valentine's Day spin on "A Christmas Carol", Pepper Ann is visited by the ghosts of her past, present, and future to see why she hates Valentine's Day, what others think about her hatred of the holiday, and what will happen if she doesn't change her ways.
 Aqua Teen Hunger Force (2002) "Cybernetic Ghost of Christmas Past from the Future" starts out as a Christmas Carol parody, with the eponymous time-traveling cybernetic spectre showing Carl a Christmas Day from his childhood, before the memory is interrupted by a robot war (which he doesn't remember because back then it was only a prophecy)
 The Simpsons (2003) 'Tis the Fifteenth Season" After watching Mr. McGrew's Christmas Carol, Homer mends his selfish ways and becomes the nicest guy in town, making Ned Flanders jealous.
 Veggie Tales: "An Easter Carol" (2004), a direct-to-video adaption which is similar, but is themed around Easter instead of Christmas.
 Kappa Mikey (2006) "A Christmas Mikey", in which Ozu fills the Scrooge role and is visited by the Ghosts of Japanese Christmas. In this case, Ozu is only shown his past, and when the Present Ghost shows up, the Past Ghost explains Ozu's sad backstory and the three decide to ruin Christmas until the Future Ghost appears and sets them straight.
 Bah, Humduck! A Looney Tunes Christmas (2006) the second Looney Tunes adaptation; this time in modern times featuring Daffy Duck as Scrooge.
 A Christmas Carol: Scrooge's Ghostly Tale (2006), animated. This version casts the famous Dickens characters as anthropomorphic animals
 American Dad! (2006) "The Best Christmas Story Never Told" With Stan's Christmas spirit at an all-time low (thanks to special interest groups trying to make the holiday season more politically correct), the Ghost of Christmas Past visits him and tries to show him the true meaning of Christmas by taking him to 1970. However, Stan is convinced that Christmas can be saved by killing Jane Fonda
 Wayside (2007) "Wayside Christmas", When Myron does not give Bebe a Secret Santa gift, a series of haphazard events confuse Myron into thinking he s actually stuck in his own version of A Christmas Carol . The other kids, including Todd, Dana and Maurecia, are baffled as he mistakes them for Ghosts of Christmas Past, Present, and Future, and in the end, Myron learns his lesson.
 Barbie in a Christmas Carol (2008), Barbie stars as a female version of Scrooge.
 Dora's Christmas Carol Adventure (2009) Despite warnings, Swiper misbehaves and lands on Santa's naughty list. Thanks to pleas from Dora, Swiper gets a chance to redeem himself: he must learn the true meaning of Christmas by finding four missing ornaments, located in the past and the future.
 The High Fructose Adventures of Annoying Orange "Orange Carol" (2012), an episode where Orange's annoying antics are spoiling everyone's holiday cheer, then a visit from three ghosts appeared and try to make Orange learn about the holiday spirit.
 The Looney Tunes Show, "A Christmas Carol" (2012), the episode features a stage adaptation of the tale written by Lola, only without going by the book due to the character of Scrooge. It's currently unclear if she had read the book Bugs gave her or not.
 Jake and the Never Land Pirates (2014): "Captain Scrooge" In this variation of Charles Dickens's A Christmas Carol, Captain Treasure Tooth visits Captain Scrooge (Captain Hook) and takes him through time.
 Thomas & Friends (2016): "Diesel's Ghostly Christmas", a special double-length episode from Series 19; a loose adaptation of the story with Diesel playing the role of Scrooge.
 My Little Pony: Friendship Is Magic includes a 2016 episode, A Hearth's Warming Tail featuring an in-universe adaption. In the episode, during the annual celebration of Hearth's Warming (the Equestrian version of Christmas), Twilight Sparkle tells Starlight Glimmer a story to get her into the spirit of the season. The story features Snowfall Frost (portrayed by Starlight Glimmer) as the story's version of Scrooge.
 The Powerpuff Girls (2017) "You're A Good Man, Mojo Jojo!" After terrorizing Townsville during the holidays, Mojo Jojo is visited that night by three ghosts resembling the Powerpuff Girls who try to make him change his ways. 
 Family Guy (2017) "Don't Be A Dickens at Christmas" Peter takes a journey around Quahog with the ghost of Patrick Swayze after he loses his Christmas spirit.
 Be Cool, Scooby-Doo! episode "Scroogey Doo" (2017) The gang travels to nineteenth-century Britain and runs into Scrooge who claims he was attacked by the ghost of his partner Jacob Marley and that three more ghosts are coming. The gang agrees to solve the mystery, but Velma wonders if she has more potential than just solving mysteries.
 Ducktales, (2018) with David Tennant as Scrooge McDuck in the episode ""Last Christmas!"
 The Loud House (2020) "A Flipmas Carol", A Scrooge-like Flip is visited by three ghosts in a special take on A Christmas Carol.

Theater 
 The Marley Carol (1993), a Christmas Play in Two Acts by Dennis Drake, taking place on the Christmas Eve that Jacob Marley gives up the ghost.
 Jacob Marley's Christmas Carol (1994), a play based on the book by Tom Mula (see below on "Literature") focusing on Jacob Marley and his attempts to redeem Scrooge lest he face eternal torment.[86]
 Tiny Tim is Dead (1998), a play by Barbara Lebow that uses A Christmas Carol as a theme within the work. A group of homeless people attempt to re-enact the story but find themselves torn apart, leaving no hope for the future.
 Mrs. Bob Cratchit's Wild Christmas Binge (2002) is a musical parody of the Charles Dickens story A Christmas Carol. Written by Christopher Durang, the play was initially commissioned by City Theatre in Pittsburgh, Pennsylvania, when Durang was asked by Artistic Director Tracy Brigden to write a Christmas comedy. It premiered on 7 November 2002 at the City Theatre, with Kristine Nielsen in the title role. This parody was revived in 2012 with additional performances in 2013
 The Last Christmas of Ebenezer Scrooge: The Sequel to A Christmas Carol (Wildside Press, 2003) by Marvin Kaye. This sequel picks up where the original left off, with Scrooge trying to right an unresolved wrong; adapted for the stage.
 Marley's Ghost (2003) by Jeff Goode is a stage play which is a prequel along similar lines to the novel by Osmun (see below in "Literature").
 A Klingon Christmas Carol (written ) is an adaptation set on the Klingon homeworld of Qo'noS in the Star Trek fictional universe. The play was co-written and directed by Christopher O. Kidder, and was performed from 2007– by Commedia Beauregard, (a Saint Paul, Minnesota, theatre company), and also presented in Chicago for 2010.
 The Trial of Ebenezer Scrooge (2007), a comedic play where, one year after the events of the original story, Scrooge sues Marley and the Spirits for kidnapping and emotional distress.
 Ebenezer Ever After, 2010, musical adapted by Dan Flowers and Fred Walton from Flowers' novel The Spirit of the Season (see below in "Literature"); premiered in Portland, Oregon in 2010.
 An American Country Christmas Carol (2010), a new musical adaptation with book and lyrics by Scott Logsdon and music by Rand Bishop, Kent Blazy, Roxie Dean, Tim Finn, Billy Kirsch, J. Fred Knobloch, and Pam Rose. It was presented as a staged reading at the Boiler Room Theatre in Franklin, Tennessee, on 5, 6, and 13 December 2010.
 Scrooge's Long Night (2014), a comedic, family-friendly take on the story with audience participation and 4 actors playing 12 roles.
 An American Christmas Carol (2014), a ballet that relocates the story to post World War II America. Produced by Ballet Fantastique, the score included the music of Frank Sinatra, Ella Fitzgerald and Nat King Cole, and was performed by Jazz singer Halie Loren. A filmed version of the ballet was released in 2020.
 Charles Dickens Writes A Christmas Carol (2015), an adaptation by Richard Quesnel, by Lost and Found Theater inc, at The Conrad Center for the Performing Arts in Kitchener, Canada. This adaptation tells the story of how A Christmas Carol came to be written, as well as the story of A Christmas Carol.
 Scrooge in Love! (2015) One year after the novella, Scrooge's life takes a turn as the romantic—new ghosts (and Jacob Marley) arrive to help him find his lost love Belle. This was produced for the first time in 2015 in San Francisco. 
 Scrooge in Love! (2016), a musical written by Duane Poole (music by Larry Grossman and lyrics by Kellan Blair) in which Ebenezer Scrooge, rather than being miserly, sees money as a cure-all and takes generosity overboard.
 Solstice Song: A Christmas Carol for the 21st Century (2016) by Deirdre Duffy. A re-imagining of Dickens' classic, set in Washington DC on Winter Solstice 2012, in which Andrew Blossom (the "Scrooge"), a widowed defense contractor, is visited by his deceased wife Lydia (the "Marley") and by the ghosts of conspiracy theory past (CV Groves/SS Californian), present (John F Kennedy/South Tower, morning of 11 September), and future (the Falling Man/worldwide ecological catastrophe), who seek to help Blossom come to terms with the loss of his son on 11 September and the power he holds as a survivor. Produced as an enhanced audio drama in 2020.
 A Dickensian Christmas (2016), a staged lecture and reading produced by Andrew McKinnon exploring the story behind A Christmas Carol. The show was presented by Tama Matheson, and featured carols performed by Tahu Matheson, Teddy Tahu Rhodes, and the Australian Youth Choir. It was presented as one-night only events at the Melbourne Recital Centre and Sydney's City Recital Hall.
 A Christmas Carol (2017), a new adaptation by Deborah McAndrew, directed by Amy Leach for Hull Truck Theatre. This production transferred to the Leeds Playhouse for Christmas 2018, then it returned during the Christmas 2020 season. This version relocates the story to the North of Victorian, England.
 In January 2019, Winchester (UK) based theatre company Blue Apple Theatre staged a re-working of the story with an actress with Down Syndrome, Katy Francis, in the leading part of 'Emilina' Scrooge. The show was performed at Theatre Royal Winchester.
 An Actors Carol (2019), a comedic adaptation by Charles Evered, telling the story of a burned out actor who has played the character of Scrooge one too many times, has a nervous breakdown and is visited by three ghosts of his own. Written for as few as four actors. First premiered in California in 2015, starring Tony winning actor Hal Linden. Published in 2019 by Broadway Play Publishing, Inc.
 A Christmas Carol (2019), performed in the Royal Lyceum Theatre in Edinburgh, relocates the play to Edinburgh, with a notable change to the plot being the addition of Greyfriars Bobby.
 Dolly Parton's Smoky Mountain Christmas Carol (2019); stage musical with music and lyrics by Dolly Parton and book by David H. Bell, set during the 1930s in the Smoky Mountains of East Tennessee, this production imagines Ebenezer Scrooge as the owner of a mining company town. Performed at Boston's Emerson Colonial Theatre in 2019, also Stanley Industrial Alliance Stage in 2021 and the Southbank Centre in 2022.
 A Christmas Carol (2020), a film adaptation by David and Jacqui Morris. A grandmother narrates the story to her children as the children prepare a toy theatre for their annual performance of A Christmas Carol. Simon Russell Beale is the voice of Scrooge.
 A Christmas Carol Live (2020), a filmed version of Jefferson Mays' one man show adaptation of the story. The show was filmed at United Palace in New York and later released for a limited time on the streaming site On The Stage.

Radio
 On 24 December 1959, The BBC Home Service broadcast the first episode of series 10 of The Goon Show, titled "A Christmas Carol", starring Spike Milligan, Peter Sellers and Harry Secombe.
 On 9 April 1980, the Mutual Radio Theater broadcast a radio play entitled "The Last of Scrooge", starring Vincent Price as the Narrator and Hans Conried as Scrooge, relating the events occurring after Scrooge's reformation that eventually brought the old man to an unhappy and miserable end.
Scrooge Blues (2016) was written by Nicholas McInerny and broadcast on BBC Radio 4 in December 2002 and re-broadcast on BBC Radio 7 on 28 December 2010. This continuation, starring David Hargreaves, takes place one year after the events of A Christmas Carol after the transformation of Ebenezer Scrooge.
 In Bleak Expectations, a Dickensian pastiche comedy series, the protagonist Philip 'Pip' Bin (played by Tom Allen) unsuccessfully attempts to become a novelist to raise himself out of poverty, one of his rejected attempts starting "How Ebenezer Scrooge hated Harvest Festival". Later, his arch-nemesis Gently Benevolent disguises himself as the Ghost of Harvest Festival Past in order to con Pip out of his fortune by imparting moral lessons via poorly workshopped theatrical performances passed off as visions.
 In John Finnemore's Souvenir Programme, Finnemore's storyteller character tells the story of Christopher Mascheer, an employee at the Toy Crusher Corporation who plans to spend Christmas Day working rather than spending time with his family. After being shown his lonely future by the ghost of his childhood friend Rufus (a lion), Mascheer resolves to ignore his family completely to become Toy Crusher CEO sooner.
 In The Museum of Everything, an audiovisual display ride details the life of Thomas Queasley, the worst-selling author in Victorian Britain whose works are clear plagiarisms of Charles Dickens's. One such example is An Easter Sing-song.

Literature 
 God Bless Us Every One (Methuen, 1985) by Andrew Angus Dalrymple. Subtitled Being An Imagined Sequel to "A Christmas Carol" and featuring all the major characters of the original in 1843, the year of the original's publication (the original is dated as having occurred seven years earlier here), expanding upon the Cratchit children Tim and Belinda.
 Tiny Tim Strikes Back, short story (by 'Chuck Dickens') in The Utterly Utterly Merry Comic Relief Christmas Book; Tiny Tim takes exception to his nickname.
 "Whatever Became of Tiny Tim?" (1992) by John Mortimer (New York Times Book Review). In this short story, Tim grew up to be a successful businessman and gained a knighthood, but became even more heartless than Scrooge (beginning his career by embezzling funds from Scrooge's Christmas turkey fund, then buying Scrooge out and pensioning off his own father). After moving to North Africa, he is visited on Christmas night 1894 by the ghosts of Scrooge and Christmas Yet-to-Come who force him to see a horrible vision of the world in 1992.
 Jacob Marley's Christmas Carol (1994), a book by Tom Mula focusing on Jacob Marley and his attempts to redeem Scrooge lest he face eternal torment.[86]
 Timothy Cratchit's Christmas Carol, 1917 (1998) by Dale K. Powell. A sequel novel to the Charles Dickens classic (Dickens World, 1998). In this version, an elderly Tiny Tim is a wealthy immigrant living in America who experiences his own spiritual visitations on Christmas Eve.
 The Spirit of the Season, 1998, by Don Flowers; Paralleling the visitations of the three "spirits" 20 years before, Scrooge prevails on a grown-up Tim Cratchit to help to him try to reconnect with and win freedom for Marley's Ghost. Later adapted by Flowers and Fred Walton as a musical, Ebenezer Ever After (see above in "Theater").
 Marley's Ghost, (2000), by Mark Hazard Osmun: The prequel to A Christmas Carol. A novel imagining the life and afterlife of Scrooge's partner, Jacob Marley and how Marley came to arrange Scrooge's chance at redemption.
 Mr. Timothy (HarperCollins, 2003) by Louis Bayard. Here again is an adult Tiny Tim, only this time as a 23-year-old resident of a London brothel who becomes embroiled in a murder mystery. Mr. Timothy was included in The New York Times list of Notable Fiction for 2003.
 The Haunting Refrain to Charles Dickens' "A Christmas Carol" (2004, revised 2007). This short novel details the lives of the original characters, plus a few new introductions, 21 years later. It is posted exclusively to the web at his time and is out of print from its original printing run.
 The Trial of Ebenezer Scrooge (Ohio State University Press, 2001) by Bruce Bueno de Mesquita. A uniquely philosophical take on the Scrooge mythology set in the afterlife with Scrooge on trial to determine if he merits entry into Paradise.
 Scrooge & Cratchit (2002) by Matt McHugh. Bob Cratchit is now Scrooge's partner in business as they both face the wrath of bankers as ruthless as Scrooge in his prime. Reprinted in 2007 as The Index-Journal holiday edition insert. In print and Kindle/iPhone/ebook formats.
 The Last Christmas of Ebenezer Scrooge: The Sequel to A Christmas Carol (Wildside Press, 2003) by Marvin Kaye. This sequel picks up where the original left off, with Scrooge trying to right an unresolved wrong. This version was also adapted for the stage (see above in "Theater").
 Hanukkah, Shmanukkah!, (2005) book written by Esme Raji Codell and illustrated by LeUyen Pham, re-imagines the 'Carol' story as a Chanukkah tale, with a miserly factory owner ("Scroogemacher") being visited by the spirits of three rabbis, each representing a different era of Jewish history.
 Marly's Ghost: A Remix of Charles Dickens' A Christmas Carol (2005), a young adult novel written by David Levithan and illustrated by Brian Selznick
 Starring Tracy Beaker (2006), a children's book by Jacqueline Wilson that revolves around Tracy's involvement in a school production of A Christmas Carol
 I am Scrooge: A Zombie Story for Christmas (2009) is a novel by Adam Roberts dealing with the aftermath of Tiny Tim's parlous health. It turns out that the child was a harbinger of an infectious virus that threatens a zombie apocalypse, and it is left to Scrooge and the Ghosts of Christmas Past, Present and Future to rectify the matter.
 Scrooge: The Year After (2012) is a sequel written by Judy La Salle taking place one year after the events of the original novel, following Scrooge's attempt to investigate the cause of his sister Fan's death. It is broken into volumes, and thus far, only the first volume of the sequel has been released.
 An Amish Christmas Carol (Amish Christian Classic Series Book 1) (2012) by Sarah Price
 One Last Christmas Carol: The Saga of Scrooge Continues (2012) by T. J. Cloonan (Author), R. A. Cloonan (Photographer). Dicken's characters become involved in a Victorian era mystery.
 What did Scrooge do next? A fascinating sequel to Charles Dickens's famous story 'A Christmas Carol''' (2013) by Michael Allen. In his famous story 'A Christmas Carol', Charles Dickens introduced us to Ebenezer Scrooge – and anyone who is familiar with that story will surely have wondered whether Scrooge really did change his ways. So here's the answer.
 Tim Cratchit's Christmas Carol: The Sequel to the Celebrated Dickens Classic (2014) by Jim Piecuch. Tiny Tim is all grown up in this continuation of Charles Dickens's beloved holiday classic, and this time a certain ghost shows him the true meaning of Christmas cheer.
 Jacob T. Marley, a 2014 novel by William R. Bennett focusing on Jacob Marley, how he influenced Scrooge into becoming worse than he was, and his attempts to make amends posthumously.
 "Scroogical" (2014), a modern retelling of the tale that begins with Jacob Marley making a bet with the Ghost of Christmas Present, who doubles as a broker for souls.
 A Kindle short story collection A Christmas Carol: The Death of Tiny Tim and Other Dark Stories by Joseph L. Calvarese was published in 2014. The title story is a murder mystery that suggests that Scrooge sent the prize turkey to the Cratchit family with ill intent.
 The Life and Times of Bob Cratchit: A Background Story to Charles Dickens' A Christmas Carol (2015), by Dixie Distler a novel detailing how Bob Cratchit grew up and came to work at Scrooge and Marley's, how he got married, and other events before the story began.
 Changed by Christmas: The Sequel to Charles Dickens's A Christmas Carol (2015) by Elizabeth W. Watkins.
 A Christmas Carol II: The Rise of the Juggernauts (2016) by Nicholas Kaminsky. A fantasy tale in which Scrooge has died, and Tiny Tim has become a martial artist. Tiny Tim must battle a treacherous secret society and a mechanical army, called the Juggernauts.
 The Three Scrooges (2016) by Jeff Lane. The three spirits return to visit Scrooge accompanied by two new spirits, Ebenezer himself from two different times in his life
 Jacob – A Denouement in One Act (2017), a story set roughly 80 years after the original where Jacob Marley, having played all three ghosts with no idea if his visit was successful, learns of the positive effects he had on Scrooge and London as a whole that may free him of his chains.
 Marley (2017), a serialized web novella focusing on Jacob Marley in the days before A Christmas Carol, primarily his life and how he came to redeem Ebenezer. It also shows the background of the three Ghosts and features action sequences as someone Marley knew in life, and spurned, steals the Ghost of Christmas Present's torch in an effort to permanently stop the dead visiting the living.
 Tiny Tim and The Ghost of Ebenezer Scrooge: The sequel to A Christmas Carol (2017) by Norman Whaler. In this romantic sequel, Ebenezer Scrooge dies suddenly just days before Christmas. Tiny Tim, now a young man who lost his sweetheart, battles anger and lost faith. Scrooge's ghost returns to teach him a much needed lesson.
 A Vegan Christmas Carol (2018), book written by S. E. Harrison, provides a full-text adaptation in which animal-based products have been replaced.
 The Society of Scrooge: The Further Trials and Triumphs of Scrooge and His Companions (2019) by Judy La Salle that continues the story the author began in the novel Scrooge: The Year After, which was published in 2012
 A Christmas Carol Sequel: "The Redemption of Jacob Marley" (2019) a Kindle book by Andrew Passehl. Scrooge decides to help the Ghost of Jacob Marley obtain his redemption.
 Christmas Parcel: Sequel to Charles Dickens' Classic "A Christmas Carol" (2019) by Alydia Rackham. Ebenezer Scrooge is dead, and Timothy Cratchit has grown into a young man who is terrified of poverty, willing to forfeit Christmas to chase business ventures. Scrooge's ghost is determined not to allow Tim to follow in his footsteps.
 A Fifth Visitor: Or How Scrooge Kept Christmas (2019) by John D. Payne. Five years after Scrooge's famous Christmas Eve, he is visited again by a new spirit.
 Mary's Song: A Sequel to Charles Dickens' A Christmas Carol (2019) by Dixie Distler, a follow up to the author's 2015 novel "The Life and Times of Bob Cratchit" in which Scrooge must fight to save Christmas from dark forces.
 Ebenezer's First Noel: A Prequel to The Christmas Carol (2019) by Philip Wik. In this retelling, Jacob sends Ebenezer back to his days when he was in love with Belle for one last chance for love and to save Marley from his ghostly torments. Pursued by the criminal Professor James Moriarty, Ebenezer and Belle and their children Catherine and Heathcliff spend much of their lives in mid-nineteenth century Australia. This novel combines characters and elements from Sir Arthur Conan Doyle, H.G. Wells and Dickens.
 Marley: A Novel (2019) by Jon Clinch. The story of Jacob Marley, business partner to Ebenezer Scrooge, the man who will be both the making and the undoing of Scrooge.

 Video game adaptations 
 Mega Man Christmas Carol (2010) – In this Mega Man fangame, Mega Man gets his Christmas presents stolen by an evil Santa Claus. To get the presents back, Mega Man must fight four Robot Masters based on the four ghosts from A Christmas Carol.
 Mega Man Christmas Carol 2 (2011) – The sequel to Mega Man Christmas Carol. Mega Man, Proto Man and Bass fight against five more Robot Masters based on A Christmas Carol characters.

 Podcasts 
 THREE GHOSTS (2020), book and music by C.E. Simon, Lyrics by Liz Muller. THREE GHOSTS is an epic retelling of Charles Dickens' A Christmas Carol, with a cast of over 40 people from all over the world. Released on 19 December 2020.

See also
 List of Christmas films
 List of ghost films

 References 

 Further reading 
 Fred Guida, A Christmas Carol and Its Adaptations: Dickens's Story on Screen and Television'', McFarland & Company, 2000. .

Lists of works based on short fiction
Works based on A Christmas Carol
History of fiction
Christmas-related lists